Democratic Left People's Party was a short-lived political party in Turkey. It was founded by ex-members of Democratic Left Party, led by Rahşan Ecevit. Its founding leader was Hulki Cevizoğlu. Cevizoğlu quit the office on January 13, 2010. In the founder's meeting on January 17, 2010, Rahşan Ecevit was elected as new leader.

In May 2010, after Deniz Baykal's resignation of leadership of Republican People's Party, major left-wing party in Turkey, there was strong support for Kemal Kılıçdaroğlu in the left-wing media. Rahşan Ecevit also supported Kılıçdaroğlu for the sake of unity in the left-wing. She joined the CHP congress on May 22, 2010, when Kılıçdaroğlu was elected as the new leader. Finally, the founder's board chose to close the party on June 12, 2010.

Leaders

References

Defunct social democratic parties in Turkey
Kemalist political parties
Political parties established in 2009
2009 establishments in Turkey
2010 disestablishments in Turkey
Political parties disestablished in 2010